The March of the One Hundred Thousand was a manifestation of popular protest against the Military dictatorship in Brazil, which occurred on June 26, 1968 in Rio de Janeiro, organized by the student movement and with the participation of artists, intellectuals and other sectors of Brazilian society.

Prelude

Arbitrary arrests were the marks of the action of the military government, for the growing protests of students against the dictatorship that had settled in the country in 1964. Police repression reached its peak in late March 1968 with the invasion of the university restaurant "Calabouço" (Dungeon), where students protested against the rising price of meals. During the raid, the commander of the troops of the PM, aspiring Aloisio Raposo, killed student Edson Luís de Lima Souto, 18 years old, he was shot in the chest.

The fact, that moved across the country, served to inflame passions. In the wake of the student, the confrontation with police occurred in various parts of Rio de Janeiro. In the following days, protests ensued in the city center, all suppressed with violence, culminating in the mass of the Candelária church (April 2nd), when the horse soldiers assaulted students, priests and reporters.

In early June 1968, the student movement began to organize an increasing number of public demonstrations. On the march 18, which ended at the Palace of Culture, resulted in the arrest of student leader, Jean Marc van der Weid.
.
The next day, the movement met at Federal University of Rio de Janeiro to organize protests and demand the release of Jean and other students arrested. But the result was the arrest of 300 students at the end of the assembly.

Three days later, a student demonstration in front of the U.S. embassy, sparked a conflict that ended with 28 dead, hundreds injured, a thousand prisoners and 15 police cars burned. That day became known as  "Bloody Friday".

Given the negative impact of the episode, the military ended up allowing a student demonstration, scheduled for June 26. According to General Louis France, 10 thousand policemen were ready to take action, if necessary.

The march

Early in the morning, participants of the march already took to the streets of the neighborhood Cinelândia, in downtown Rio de Janeiro. The march began at 14:00, with about 50 thousand people. An hour later, that number had doubled. In addition to students, also artists, intellectuals, politicians and other segments of Brazilian civil society swelled the march, making it one of the largest and most significant demonstrations of the Brazilian republican history.

Passing in front of the Candelaria Church, the march stopped to listen to a speech by student leader Vladimir Pereira, who remembered the death of Edson Luis and demanded an end to the military dictatorship. 

Led by a huge band with the words "Down with the Dictatorship. The people in power", the march went on for three hours, ending in front of the Legislature, without conflict with the strong police apparatus that accompanied the demonstration popular throughout its journey.

References

 Teixeira, Evandro. 1968 Destinos 2008: passeata dos 100 mil. Textual, 2008.
 Valle, Maria Ribeiro do. 1968: O diálogo é a violência: movimento estudantil e ditadura militar no Brasil. Campinas: Unicamp, 1999.

Military dictatorship in Brazil
1968 in Brazil
União Nacional dos Estudantes
June 1968 events in South America